Lecania hydrophobica is a species of crustose lichen in the family Ramalinaceae. Found in Alaska, it was described as a new species in 2020 by Toby Spribille and Alan Fryday. The type specimen was collected in the Hoonah-Angoon Census Area of Glacier Bay National Park. Here it was found at an altitude of  growing on a vertical shale outcrop. The specific epithet hydrophobic refers to the hydrophobic (water-repelling) properties of the lichen, which are possibly imparted by the wax-like filaments on the surface of the apothecial disc. Lecania hydrophobica is abundant on sheltered rock overhangs in the type locality, and is also known to occur further south – on southern Baranof Island, and in British Columbia.

References

Ramalinaceae
Lichen species
Lichens described in 2020
Lichens of Western Canada
Lichens of Subarctic America
Taxa named by Toby Spribille
Fungi without expected TNC conservation status